Thomas O'Donoghue ( – date of death unknown) was an Irish Sinn Féin politician from Cahersiveen, County Kerry. He was elected unopposed as a Sinn Féin Teachta Dála (TD) to the Second Dáil at the 1921 elections for the Kerry–Limerick West constituency. 

He opposed the Anglo-Irish Treaty and voted against it. He was re-elected unopposed as an anti-Treaty Sinn Féin TD to the Third Dáil at the 1922 general election though he did not take his seat. He was re-elected at the 1923 general election for the Kerry constituency and again did not take his seat. He did not stand at the June 1927 general election.

References

1890s births
Year of death missing
Early Sinn Féin TDs
Members of the 2nd Dáil
Members of the 3rd Dáil
Members of the 4th Dáil
People of the Irish Civil War (Anti-Treaty side)
Politicians from County Kerry